Rhys Morgan Richards is a former New Zealand diplomat and a current historian and ethnographer. He has written extensively on maritime history and Pacific artifacts and art. He has also spoken on these subjects on New Zealand radio and at many conferences and seminars around the world.

Early life
He attended the University of Canterbury in Christchurch where he completed a Master of Arts degree. The title of his MA thesis is, An historical geography of Chatham Island (1962).

Diplomat
After graduating from university he worked as a career diplomat in the New Zealand Foreign Service. His diplomatic postings included New York, Hong Kong, Manila, Geneva, Apia, and Honiara .  

He was responsible for overseeing New Zealand government aid to Melanesia. 

From 1996 to 1999 he was the New Zealand High Commissioner to the Solomon Islands.

He was a programme editor, writer and presenter for Radio New Zealand International. He has served as chairman of the Pacific Conservation and Development Trust.

In retirement he and his wife Margaret live in Wellington, New Zealand. They have three children.

Historian
He has written many books, journal articles, chapters in books, book reviews and articles in newspapers. He has also contributed content to online resources, such as The Encyclopedia of New Zealand and the British Southern Whale Fishery website.

Richards served on the committee of the Friends of the Turnbull Library (2000-2016).

In the year 2000, he was presented with the 16th annual L. Byrne Waterman Award for his "outstanding contribution to maritime history," in a ceremony at The Kendall Whaling Museum, Massachusetts.

In 2002, he held a Visiting Research Fellowship for Pacific Arts at the Sainsbury Research Unit at the University of East Anglia.

In 2008, he was awarded a Tasmanian Research Fellowship by the State Library of Tasmania.

He describes his research as, “strongly committed to testing prevailing generalities through quantitive research drawing on primary materials.”

Select bibliography
 Whaling and sealing at the Chatham Islands (1982), Canberra, Roebuck, 
 Which Pakeha ate the last Moa, (1986) Wellington, Paremata Press.
 (editor), Frederick Hunt of Pitt Island, (1990), Petone, New Zealand, Lithographic Services, 
 (with R. A. Pierce), Captain Simeon Metcalfe: Pioneer fur trader in the Pacific Northwest, Hawaii and China, 1787-1794, (1991) Kingston, Ontario, Limestone Press, 
 (with Jocelyn Chisholm) Bay of Islands shipping arrivals and departures 1803-1840 (1992) Wellington, Paremata Press, 
 Samoa's forgotten whaling heritage; American whaling in Samoan waters 1824-1848 (1992) Apia, Western Samoa Historical and Cultural Trust, 
 (editor) David Holmes, My 70 years on the Chatham Islands; reminiscences, (1993), Christchurch, Shoal Bay Press, 
 Into the South Seas: The Southern whale fishery comes of age on the Brazil Banks, 1765 to 1812; A review of the whaling activities of American, British, French, Spanish and Portuguese whalemen off Brazil and Patagonia before 1812, (1993) Wellington, Paremata Press & IWC, Brazil, 
 United States trade with China 1784-1814, (1994) Salem, Massachusetts, Special Supplement to Vol 54 of The American Neptune, 
 The Foveaux yarns of Yankee Jack; Burr Osborn's adventures in southern New Zealand in 1845, (1995), Dunedin, Otago Heritage Press, 
 Murihiku re-viewed: a revised history of southern New Zealand from 1804 to 1844, (1995), Wellington, Lithographic Services, 
 (editor, with translation by Lene Knight) Jorgen Jorgenson's Observations on Pacific trade; and sealing and whaling in Australian waters before 1805 (1996) Wellington, The Paremata Press,  
 Honolulu centre of trans-Pacific trade; shipping arrivals and departures 1820 to 1840, (2000), Canberra, Pacific Manuscripts Bureau and the Hawaiian Historical Society, 
 How many whales were killed in Pacific Forum EEZ's: a short review for Pacific Forum States, (2000), Wellington, R. Richards, 
 (with Margaret Richards) Pacific artifacts brought home by American whalemen; a report by Rhys and Margaret Richards for the New Bedford Whaling Museum; Pacific Islands curiosities, objects, artifacts and art in museums in New England and Long Island, (2000), Wellington, Paremata Press & The New Bedford Whaling Museum, 
 (editor) The Moriori language of the ancestors on the Chatham Islands: Reo Moriori o nga karapuna o Rekohu (2001), Wellington, Te Taa Haeretahi, the Hand in Hand Press, for the Paremata Press, 
 Pakeha around Porirua before 1840: sealers, whalers, flax traders and Pakeha visitors before the arrival of the New Zealand Company settlers at Port Nicholson in 1840, (2002) Wellington, Paremata Press, 
 (with Kenneth Roga) Not quite extinct: Melanesian bark cloth ('tapa') from western Solomon Islands; with interpretations by Reuben Lilo; and illustrations by Jackie Frizelle and Virginia Bond Korda, (February 2005, revised & reprinted October 2005), Wellington, Paremata Press, 
 Manu Moriori: Human and bird carvings on live Kopi trees on the Chatham Islands, (2007), Wellington, Paremata Press, 
 Tahiti and the Society Islands; shipping arrivals and departures 1767 to 1852, (2008) Canberra, Pacific Manuscripts Bureau and Jean-Louis Boglio Maritime Books, 
 Easter Island 1793 to 1861: observations by early visitors before slave raids (2008), Los Osos, California, The Easter Island Foundation, 
 (with Bill Carter) A decade of disasters; the Chatham Islands from 1866 to 1875, (2009), Wellington, Paremata Press, 
 Sperm whaling on the Solanders Ground and in Fiordland; a maritime historian's perspective; NIWA Information Series No.76, (2010), Wellington, National Institute of Water and Atmospheric Research, 
 Sealing in the southern oceans, 1788-1833, (2011), Wellington, Paremata Press, 
 The Austral Islands; history, art and art history, (2012), Wellington, Paremata Press, 
 Headhunters black and white: three collectors in the western Solomon Islands, 1893 to 1914,  (2012) Wellington, Paremata Press, 
 Captain Charles Bayley, whaling master, 1813-1875, (2014) Hobart, Navarine Publishing/Roebuck, 
 Foreign visitors to the Cook Islands 1773 to 1840, (2014) Wellington, Paremata Press, 
 Tracking travelling Taonga: A narrative review of how Maori artifacts got to London from 1798, to Salem in 1802, 1807 and 1812, and elsewhere globally up to 1840, (2015) Wellington, Paremata Press, 
 Bold captains: trans-Pacific exploration and trade 1780-1830, Vol 1 & 2, (2017) Wellington, Paremata Press, 
 Moriori: origins, lifestyles and language, (2018) Wellington, Paremata Press, 
 Kuphus polythalamia: alive or dead in the Western Solomon Islands?, (2019), Wellington, Paremate Press, 
 (editor with Graeme Broxam), The last of the sail whalers: whaling off Tasmania and southern New Zealand / by Captain William McKillop (1865-1938), (2019) Hobart, Navarine Publishing. 
 The First Pakehas around Wellington and Cook Strait: 1803 to 1839, (2020) Wellington, Paremata Press, 
 Maori who went sperm whaling before 1840, (2021) Wellington, Paremata Press,

References

Historians of the Pacific
Living people
20th-century New Zealand historians
New Zealand maritime historians
University of Canterbury alumni
20th-century New Zealand male writers
21st-century New Zealand historians
Historians of the British Empire
Maritime historians
New Zealand diplomats
New Zealand public servants
Year of birth missing (living people)
New Zealand book and manuscript collectors